Cyane (minor planet designation: 403 Cyane) is a typical Main belt asteroid.

It was discovered by Auguste Charlois on 18 May 1895 in Nice.

References

External links
 
 

Background asteroids
Cyane
Cyane
S-type asteroids (Tholen)
S-type asteroids (SMASS)
18950518